Leeswood and Pontblyddyn is a community in Flintshire, Wales in the United Kingdom, including the villages of Leeswood and Pontblyddyn. The council was renamed on 26 January 2016.

References 

Communities in Flintshire